Teodora Aleksandrova (born 17 July 2001) is a Bulgarian group rhythmic gymnast. She is the 2017 World Group All-around silver medalist and the 2015 European Junior Group bronze medalist.

References

External links
 

Living people
Bulgarian rhythmic gymnasts
Gymnasts from Sofia
2001 births